The Clear Lake Community School District is a rural public school district that serves the town of Clear Lake, Iowa and surrounding areas in Cerro Gordo County.

The school's mascot is the Lion. Their colors are black and gold.

Schools
The district operates three schools, all in Clear Lake:
Clear Lake Elementary School
Clear Lake Middle School
Clear Lake High School

See also
List of school districts in Iowa

References

External links
 Clear Lake Community School District

Education in Cerro Gordo County, Iowa
School districts in Iowa